Rimac may refer to:

Places
 Rímac River, in Peru
 Rímac District, one of the districts in the Historical Center of Lima, Peru
 Rimac (crater), a crater on Mars

People with the surname

 Beti Rimac (born 1976) Croatian volleyball player
 Davor Rimac (born 1971) Croatian basketball player
 Josipa Rimac (born 1980) Croatian politician
 Mate Rimac (born 1988) founder of Rimac Automobili
 Ružica Meglaj-Rimac (1941–1996) Yugoslav basketball player
 Slaven Rimac (born 1974) Croatian basketball player

Sports
 RIMAC, a sports complex at the University of California San Diego
 Ružica Meglaj-Rimac Cup, the national women's basketball cup of Croatia

Transportation and vehicles
 Rimac Automobili, a Croatian electric car manufacturer
 Rimac Concept One
 Rimac Nevera
 Chilean transport Rímac (1872), a ship
 Several Peruvian Navy ships named Rimac, see list of Peruvian Navy ships

Other uses
 Telmatobius rimac, a species of Peruvian frog

See also